Roberto Pumpido (15 December 1948 – 8 December 2008) was a Cuban gymnast. He competed in eight events at the 1968 Summer Olympics.

References

1948 births
2008 deaths
Cuban male artistic gymnasts
Olympic gymnasts of Cuba
Gymnasts at the 1968 Summer Olympics
Sportspeople from Havana